The Arcadia Fund is a UK charity organization founded by Lisbet Rausing and Professor Peter Baldwin. Established in 2001, the organization provides grants on a worldwide basis focusing on numerous projects outside the UK. The primary focus of the organization is to preserve endangered culture and nature and to provide open access. Its Mission statement outlines the organization's philosophical view  to: "serve humanity (and) to preserve cultural heritage and ecosystems". The organization believes that "once memories, knowledge, skills, variety, and intricacy disappear – once the old complexities are lost – they are hard to replicate or replace" and consequently want to, "build a vibrant, resilient, green future".

Since 2002, the fund has provided in excess of $910 million in projects around the world. According to the OECD, Arcadia Fund’s financing for 2019 development increased by 6% to US$55 million.

The foundation is controlled by its three trustees (Lisbet Rausing, Peter Baldwin and Johannes Burger) and its team of nine members. The fund also has an advisory board of seven members.

History 
. Since its inception, the fund has averaged yearly grant awards of $35,625,000. Its grants are divided into five categories: Cultural, Environmental, Open Access, Discretionary and Discontinued Themes. As seen by the Table 41% of grant funding is cultural, 37% Environmental, 6% Open Access, 8% Discretionary and 7% Legacy.

Its supported causes have been-as mentioned earlier-the preservation of endangered culture and nature and the provision of open access. The fund has a selected issues criterion in which the organization use's to choose grants. The methodology of grant choices has not changed since 2002. However, supported causes have altered slightly.

Aims

The organization aims to provide cultural grants to universities, archives or museums that preserve cultural heritage and digitize near-extinct cultural heritage. Additionally, it intends to supply environmental grants to organizations that preserve endangered habitats at risk land as well as trains staff and enable research and policy development. It also aims to provide open access grants to increase obtention of free material such online as research papers and publications.

Previously, the fund  also supported causes such as human rights, philanthropy and education;  however since 2009 the support for the causes have been discontinued.  The fund supported organizations around these discontinued themes that helped refugee scholars, educated disadvantaged children in Africa, and conducted women's right advocacy.

Activities 
The fund awards grants to organisations preserving endangered culture, preserving nature, and promoting open access.

Culture 
Arcadia's largest grant was in 2002, to the School of Oriental and African Studies— totalling £20 million (US$33,851,813) to start the Endangered Language Documentation Program (ELDP). The program enables scholars to undertake documentation of disappearing languages. By 2015, the program has documented over 350 languages. The grant also funds training scholars in modern language documentation techniques. The fund   donated another US$11 million in April 2015 .

In  2004 the fund founded the Endangered Archives Program at the British Library with a $25 million grant supporting the digitisation of at risk collections around the world. By Sept 2018,  the program has supported more than 350 documentation programs in 90 countries, with over 6.5 million images and 25,000 sound tracks being preserved. The material is available freely online as part of the Endangered Archives Programme. In 2018 the fund gave an additional  £9 million to fund the program for a further 7 years.

In 2013 and 2015 provide $1 million to the Smithsonian Institution's collaboration with the Natural History Museum's "Recovering Voices Initiative,"  a long-term project  to digitise audio recordings, manuscripts and photographs. It aims to digitise the entire collection of ethnographic sound recordings, estimated at 3,000 hours, and 35,000 pages of manuscript materials. In 2015 it  provided a $511,200 to the Smithsonian Campaign, 'The Field Book Project', to preserve field books, the  original records of scientific expeditions.   The grant aimed to support the digitising of 2600 field books, all which will be open access. Currently, the project has catalogued over 9,500 field books and digitised over 4,000.

Environment 
The fund in 2018 donated £23 million (US$31,441,100)  to the Cambridge Conservative Initiative (CCI) for its Endangered Landscapes Programme (ELP). Arcadia in collaboration with CCI and 9 other conservation organisations aim to restore priority landscape across Europe in an attempt to support viable populations of native species, provide room for natural ecological processes, resilience of ecosystems to short or long term changes.

The fund in 2018 awarded Fauna & Flora International   $USD 27,000,000 for Halcyon Land & Sea Fund. The partnership started in 1998 where Peter Baldwin and Lisbet Rausing developed the idea in conjunction with FFI to develop the Halcyon Fund in which secures highly threatened sites to protect them under local management. As of 2018, the Fund has supported 46 projects in 25 countries, protecting 55.8 million hectares of habitat. Since 2011, Arcadia has provided support in which has supported 34 initiatives across 18 countries. Currently, Arcadia's total funding to FFI is $USD 51,550,000 million. In 2015, Arcadia ordered an independent expert review of the work it had funded through FFI. The results provided positive conclusions where it was stated that, "The report clearly recognises the invaluable role that Arcadia has played in helping FFI evolve into the organisation it is today, by providing long-term and flexible funding for a considerable and effective body of work.". Arcadia's impact on FFI can be seen through their first grant in 2011 developing the Halcyon Marine Programme. The programme operates across 72 sites in 17 countries engaging 88 partners and 35 community-based institutions and has already resulted in threat reduction of biodiversity recovery at 10 sites.

Open access 
Arcadia has provided multiple grants to Harvard University  to improve open access at the university. In 2009 it awarded  $5 million over a 5-year period. The grant will support the processing of 17th and 18th century collections in archives and underwrite conservation treatments to fragile or damaged 17th or 18th century collections. It will also help to catalogue and digitise documents on Harvard's history, and to run the Library Lab programme to improve digital services . The fund provided further support to the university in 2011 with an additional $11 million grant.

In September 2015, the fund provided $450,000 over three years to Creative Commons to develop tools that complement current CC licence suite.

In September 2017, Arcadia donated $5 million to the Wikimedia Foundation, the largest contribution to the foundation at the time. It gave another $3.5 million in 2019

Discretionary 
The Arcadia Fund in 2015 provided $25 million to Yale University to renovate the Yale Hall of Graduates Studies enabling the university to co-locate the dispersed humanities departments to under one roof. offering a setting for cross-disciplinary collaboration and advance research. Baldwin and Rausing have asked in tribute to the service of David Swensen (who built Yale's endowment from $1.3 billion to $23.9 billion) that the building should be named after him.

Arcadia gave £5 million to the Illuminated River Foundation in 2017 for a commissioned art installation of light to 15 of Central London's bridges along the River Thames. When the project is completed it would be the longest art commission in the world at 2.5 miles long.

Discontinued themes 
Arcadia before 2009 were involved in supporting  human rights. It supported organisations that helped refugee scholars, educate disadvantaged children in Africa, and conduct women's rights advocacy. In 2005, Arcadia provided a $5 million grant to the Mvule Trust, to provide bursaries to young women in Uganda so they can go to secondary school. The grant and trust gave 75% of scholarships to girls and by 2007 and the trust had supported the education of 1,868 children.

Arcadia has provided a total of $6 million in 2005–06 to the Human Rights Watch (US) to help their empirical research into persecution of women, and its fact gathering, press releases, advocacy and lobbying.

Grant statistics and graphs 

The Table Breakdowns Arcadia largest grants and a description of the purpose of the grant

References 

Charities based in the United Kingdom